North Carolina's 16th House district is one of 120 districts in the North Carolina House of Representatives. It has been represented by Republican Carson Smith since 2019.

Geography
Since 2023, the district has included all of Pender County, as well as part of Onslow County. The district overlaps with the 6th and 9th Senate districts.

District officeholders since 1993

Election results

2022

2020

2018

2016

2014

2012

2010

2008

2006

2004

2002

2000

References

North Carolina House districts
Pender County, North Carolina
Onslow County, North Carolina